Yurchenko is a Ukrainian patronymic surname that comes from the name Yuriy (George). It may refer to:

 David Yurchenko (born 1986), Russian-Armenian footballer
 Denys Yurchenko (born 1978), Ukrainian pole vaulter
 Ihor Yurchenko (born 1960), Soviet and Ukrainian footballer
 Henrietta Yurchenko (1916–2007), American ethnomusicologist, folklorist, radio producer, and radio host
 Kateryna Yurchenko (born 1976), Ukrainian sprint canoer
 Mikhail Yurchenko (born 1970), Kazakhstani boxer
 Mykola Yurchenko (born 1966), Ukrainian footballer
 Natalia Yurchenko (born 1965), Soviet artistic gymnast
 Yurchenko (vault), a vault routine in artistic gymnastics
 Yurchenko loop, a balance beam skill in artistic gymnastics
 Tatyana Yurchenko (born 1993), Kazakhstani middle-distance runner
 Vasyl Yurchenko (born 1950), Soviet sprint canoer
 Vitaly Yurchenko (born 1936), KGB officer
 Vladimir Yurchenko (born 1989), Belarusian footballer
 Vladlen Yurchenko, (born 1994), Ukrainian footballer

See also
 

Ukrainian-language surnames
Surnames of Ukrainian origin
Patronymic surnames
Surnames from given names